Baker's Haulover Inlet is a man-made channel in Miami-Dade County, Florida connecting the northern end of Biscayne Bay with the Atlantic Ocean. The inlet was cut in 1925 through a narrow point in the sand between the cities of Bal Harbour and Sunny Isles. It is the location of an official nude beach, recreation areas and marina in the 99-acre Haulover Park. A fixed bridge carries State Road A1A across the inlet.

The name has appeared on maps as early as 1823.

There is a State of Florida Historical Landmark Marker (over 50 years old) at the original Lighthouse Dock site dedicated on February 21, 2004, to the first charter-boat captains at the 1926–1951 dock. It is the only marker in the State of Florida for a fishing dock.

References

External links 
 Reference to earliest use of the name – retrieved November 27, 2005
 
 Historical Haulover page – retrieved September 12, 2007

Inlets of Florida
Bodies of water of Miami-Dade County, Florida